TrackR was a commercial key finder that assisted in the tracking of lost belongings and devices. Trackr was produced by the company Phone Halo and was inspired by the founders' losing their keys on a beach during a surfing trip.

The founders of Phone Halo began working on TrackR in 2009. In 2010, they founded the company and launched the product. 
In Winter 2018, TrackR rebranded itself to Adero, as part of changing its focus to other uses for its tracking technology, taking TrackR beyond the Bluetooth fobs that had been the core of its service. TrackR shut down its services and removed its apps in August 2021.

Overview
The device contains a lithium battery that needs to be changed about once a year by the user. It communicates its current location via Bluetooth 4.0, to an Android 4.4+ or iOS 8.0+ mobile device on which the TrackR app is installed and running. This feature is referred to as "Crowd Locate", since each device will report its location to all other TrackR devices in range, including those that are neither owned nor registered by the user. This feature is useful because the app must be installed and running on a nearby Bluetooth enabled device for any device's location to be relayed.

As of August 2017, over 5 million TrackR devices had been sold.

As of August 2021, the official website stated that the manufacturer has discontinued App support for both Apple and Android devices.

Technical data 

For Trackr Bravo, the producer published the following data as of August 2017:

See also 
 Key finder
 Tile (company)
 Wistiki

References

Further reading 
 
 
  
 
 
 
 

Assistive technology
Consumer electronics
Companies based in Santa Barbara, California
Defunct technology companies based in California
American companies established in 2009
Internet object tracking
American companies disestablished in 2021